José Manuel Gomes da Silva (born 24 September 1976), commonly known as Zé Gomes, is a Portuguese former footballer who played as a right-back, currently a manager.

Playing career
Born in Vila do Conde, Gomes appeared in 165 Primeira Liga matches over seven seasons, scoring a total of five goals for hometown club Rio Ave F.C. (six years) and C.S. Marítimo (one). In 2007–08, he was loaned by the latter to Konyaspor of the Turkish Süper Lig.

Gomes retired at GD Bragança in 2013 at the age of 36, and had his first managerial job at the third-division team in June 2016.

Coaching career
On 25 April 2017, Gomes reached a mutual agreement to leave Bragança after three successive defeats dented their promotion hopes. After working at Rio Ave's reserve and under-23 teams, he was hired at Académico de Viseu F.C. of the Liga Portugal 2 on 28 February 2021, taking over a side in 16th. He lost 2–1 at S.C. Covilhã on his professional debut.

Having kept the team up in 14th place, Gomes renewed his contract for one more year in June 2021. The 2021–22 campaign started with the Beira side in fifth after ten games, but a run of one point from a possible 18 cost him his job before the turn of the year.

Gomes was appointed at Académica de Coimbra on 4 March 2022, becoming the club's fourth manager of the season and not being able to prevent second-tier relegation as last.

Personal life
Gomes' younger brother Vítor was also a professional footballer, and they played together at Rio Ave.

References

External links

1976 births
Living people
People from Vila do Conde
Sportspeople from Porto District
Portuguese footballers
Association football defenders
Primeira Liga players
Liga Portugal 2 players
Segunda Divisão players
G.D. Ribeirão players
GD Bragança players
C.D.C. Montalegre players
S.C. Braga B players
A.D. Ovarense players
Rio Ave F.C. players
C.S. Marítimo players
Süper Lig players
Konyaspor footballers
Portuguese expatriate footballers
Expatriate footballers in Turkey
Portuguese expatriate sportspeople in Turkey
Portuguese football managers
Liga Portugal 2 managers
Académico de Viseu F.C. managers
Associação Académica de Coimbra – O.A.F. managers